James Howard Marshall II (January 24, 1905 – August 4, 1995) was an American billionaire businessman, academic, and government official. He was involved with and invested in the petroleum industry via academic, government and commercial endeavors. He owned 16% of Koch Industries. Marshall was married to model and celebrity Anna Nicole Smith during the last 14 months of his life. His estate became the subject of protracted litigation, which was reviewed by the Supreme Court in Marshall v. Marshall and Stern v. Marshall. The court kept the will and testament intact and substantially all of the assets in Marshall's estate wound up in trusts for the benefit of his daughter-in-law, Elaine Tettemer Marshall, and her family.

Early life and education 

Born in the Germantown section of Philadelphia, and raised a Quaker, J. Howard Marshall II attended George School, a private high school in Newtown, Pennsylvania, and then studied liberal arts at Haverford College, both Quaker institutions, graduating in 1926. While at George School and Haverford, he edited the school newspapers, captained the debate teams, was an All American soccer player, and played competitive tennis under the instruction of professional Bill Tilden. He graduated magna cum laude from Yale Law School in 1931. At Yale, he was case editor of the Yale Law Journal and studied with law and economics pioneer Walton Hale Hamilton.

Careers 
Upon graduation, from 1931 to 1933, he served as an Assistant Dean at Yale Law School and instructed courses in business, finance and procedure, while also publishing articles as a member of the influential legal realism school of thought. He worked with future Supreme Court Justice William O. Douglas on an article titled A Factual Study of Bankruptcy Administration and Some Suggestions, published in 1932. Along with Norman Meyers, he published two articles titled Legal Planning of Petroleum Production in 1931. These studies offered an alternative to the then-prevailing practices of controlled production in the petroleum industry, which were leading to dramatic boom-bust cycles. They gained the interest of the government, as many of the supporters of the New Deal were supporters of legal realism.

In 1933, Marshall left Yale to become the Assistant Solicitor at the Department of the Interior under Harold L. Ickes. He authored the Code of Fair Competition for the Petroleum Industry (1933), and the Connally Hot Oil Act of 1935 after the Supreme Court's decision to strike down the National Industrial Recovery Act. It revived legislation that regulated the flow of oil between states to protect the industry from "contraband oil" in order to stabilize falling prices. While Ickes originally considered having the government set a price floor for oil, Marshall got Ickes to sign off on a plan to require certificates of clearance for legally produced oil shipped in interstate commerce.

In 1935, he left government service to become the special counsel to Kenneth R. Kingsbury, the president of Standard Oil of California (now Chevron Corporation) in San Francisco. In 1937, he became a partner at Pillsbury Madison Sutro (now Pillsbury Winthrop Shaw Pittman), which was the company's outside counsel. In 1941, he was called back to Washington, D.C. during World War II as Solicitor of the Petroleum Administration for War, helping develop U.S. energy policy during the war, including the Cole Pipeline Act of 1941, and later as a member of the Committee on Reparations and the American Petroleum Institute. In 1944, after developing a relationship with Paul G. Blazer, he moved to Ashland, Kentucky and became Vice Chairman and President of Ashland Oil and Refining Co. (now Ashland Inc.).

In 1946, he drafted the executive order creating the National Petroleum Council (US). In 1952, he became Executive Vice President at Signal Oil & Gas under Samuel B. Mosher. In 1961, he became President of Union Texas Petroleum and moved to Houston. In 1967, he became Executive Vice President of Allied Chemical (now Honeywell). He was also a director of Coastal Corporation. In 1984, he formed Marshall Petroleum, which was primarily a holding company for his interest in Koch Industries.

Koch Industries 
In 1952, Marshall co-founded Great Northern Oil, which, in 1955, built an oil refinery in Rosemount, Minnesota that could refine heavy, sour Canadian crude oil. In 1959, Fred Koch acquired a 35% interest in Great Northern Oil for $5 million. Union Oil acquired a majority interest in Great Northern and attempted to take over the company, but Marshall and Koch, who wanted to keep their assets in private hands, blocked the takeover. In 1969, after buying out Union Oil, Charles Koch, who shared a similar business philosophy with Marshall, swapped a stake in Koch Industries for the rest of Marshall's shares in Great Northern Oil.

Personal life

Marriages and relationships 
Marshall married Eleanor Pierce in 1931 and divorced in 1961. They had two sons together: J. Howard Marshall III (born February 6, 1936) and E. Pierce Marshall (January 12, 1939 – June 20, 2006). His second marriage, to Bettye Bohannon, lasted from 1961 until her death from Alzheimer's disease in 1991.

In 1982, he met "Lady" Diane Walker at a strip club and offered to marry her if his wife Betty, who had Alzheimer's disease, were to die. Over several years, Marshall gave Walker $15 million worth of jewelry and other gifts. Walker died in 1991 at age 51 due to complications from facelift surgery. The gifts became subject to scrutiny by the Internal Revenue Service since gift taxes were not paid; Marshall claimed that the gifts were instead "consulting fees".

In 1994, at the age of 89, he married 26-year-old model Anna Nicole Smith. Their marriage lasted until his death 14 months later.

Eldest son left out of estate 
In 1980, when Marshall's eldest son, J. Howard Marshall III, sided with Bill Koch, Frederick R. Koch and other collateral family members in dispute with Charles Koch and David H. Koch over making Koch Industries a public company and paying dividends, Marshall purchased back company stock from his son, given previously as a gift, for $8 million, considered to be a premium price, and removed the eldest son from his will and testament. Conversely, during the same dispute, his youngest son E. Pierce Marshall sided with his father, and that son received substantially all of Marshall's estate, valued at $1.6 billion at the time of his death.

Death and ensuing lawsuits 
On August 4, 1995, Marshall died of pneumonia at age 90 in Houston, Texas. Following Marshall's death, Anna Nicole Smith (who died on February 8, 2007) became involved in a court battle with her former stepson, E. Pierce Marshall (who died on June 20, 2006). J. Howard's will and trust did not include Anna Nicole or J. Howard's other son, J. Howard Marshall III. Anna Nicole and J. Howard III both sought to overturn the will and trust. In 2001, they both lost their cases during a six-month Texas state court jury trial.

During the probate proceedings, Smith declared bankruptcy in California and was awarded $474 million as a sanction for E. Pierce Marshall’s alleged misconduct in discovery. In 2002, the bankruptcy judgment was vacated and Smith’s award was reduced to $88 million in a United States district court in California. In December 2004, a three-judge panel of the United States Court of Appeals for the Ninth Circuit vacated the District Court decision under the probate exception, ruling that the federal courts lacked subject matter jurisdiction over state probate matters. The Ninth Circuit decision also affirmed the primacy of Texas Probate decision which determined that no misconduct had taken place and that Smith was not one of J. Howard Marshall's heirs. However, on May 1, 2006, the Supreme Court of the United States in Marshall v. Marshall reversed the Ninth Circuit's decision regarding the probate exception, allowing Smith another opportunity to pursue her claims in federal court. The case was remanded to the Ninth Circuit for adjudication of the remaining appellate issues. On June 25, 2009, the same three-judge panel of the United States Court of Appeals for the Ninth Circuit heard oral arguments on the remaining appellate issues. On March 19, 2010, the United States Court of Appeals for the Ninth Circuit issued its second opinion on remand, finding in favor of E. Pierce Marshall, that the California Bankruptcy Court did not have jurisdiction and the California Federal District Court was precluded from reviewing matters already decided in the Texas Probate Court.

On September 28, 2010, the U.S. Supreme Court again agreed to hear the case. On June 23, 2011, the United States Supreme court decided the case in a 5–4 decision in favor of the Marshall family (now styled Stern v. Marshall 10-179). The majority of the Court decided Congress cannot constitutionally authorize non-Article III bankruptcy judges final order jurisdiction on state law based counterclaims to proofs of claim which are not necessary to resolve the claim itself.

Marshall's eldest son, J. Howard Marshall III, lost his case in Texas probate court and also lost a counterclaim against him for fraud with malice. The jury originally awarded E. Pierce Marshall $35 million in damages but the probate court reduced that amount to $10 million. J. Howard Marshall III then filed for bankruptcy in California and was discharged by the same bankruptcy judge that had administered Smith's bankruptcy. This decision was affirmed by the United States Court of Appeals for the Ninth Circuit.

Dispute over pledge to alma mater 
In 1976, Marshall pledged $4 million to his alma mater, Haverford College. However, by the time of his death in 1995, Marshall had only contributed $2 million. Haverford sued his estate in a Houston probate court; in April 2003, a jury found that Haverford hadn't been injured because it hadn't relied on Marshall's pledges.

See also 
 History of the petroleum industry in the United States

References

Bibliography

External links 
 

1905 births
1995 deaths
20th-century American businesspeople
20th-century American lawyers
20th-century Quakers
American businesspeople in the oil industry
American chief executives
American Quakers
Businesspeople from Philadelphia
Educators from Philadelphia
Haverford Fords men's soccer players
J.Howard
Pennsylvania lawyers
Lawyers from Philadelphia
United States Department of the Interior officials
Yale Law School alumni
Anna Nicole Smith
Yale Law School faculty
Association footballers not categorized by position
George School alumni
Association football players not categorized by nationality